Kool Ka Lang is a Philippine television situational comedy series broadcast by GMA Network. Starring Raymart Santiago, it premiered on October 19, 1998 on the network's KiliTV line up replacing Ibang Klase. The series concluded on October 13, 2003 and was replaced by Lagot Ka, Isusumbong Kita in its timeslot.

The series is streaming online on YouTube.

Cast and characters

Lead cast
Raymart Santiago as Jack Mangalikot
Bonel Balingit as Empoy Mangalikot
Joey Marquez as Magdaleno "Mags" Magdangal

Supporting cast
LJ Moreno as Gina
Gloria Diaz as Nadya
Blakdyak as Uling
Maureen Larrazabal as Maina
Robert "Long" Mejia as Long
Rufa Mae Quinto as Teenie
Dagul as Himself
Jomari Yllana as Bal
Benjie Paras as Jie
Alessandra de Rossi as Maji Magdangal
Maui Taylor as Waikiki
Dennis Padilla as Gancho
Isko Salvador as Clinton
Mark Wilson as Pot-Pot

References

External links
 

1998 Philippine television series debuts
2003 Philippine television series endings
Filipino-language television shows
GMA Network original programming
Philippine comedy television series